The Bilenke Rural Council (officially, Bilenke Village Council) is one of 16 rural local government areas of the Zaporizhzhia Raion (district) of Zaporizhzhia Oblast in southern Ukraine. Its population was 5,040 in the 2001 Ukrainian Census.

It was established by the Verkhovna Rada, Ukraine's parliament, on 29 December 1994. The council's administrative center is located in the village of Bilenke.

Government
The council's local government council consists of 20 locally-elected deputies. The council is represented by the No.82 single-mandate constituency for parliamentary elections in Ukraine.

Populated settlements
The Bilenke Rural Council's jurisdiction includes two villages: 
 Bilenke (pop. 4,976)
 Chervonodniprovka (pop. 64)

References

Zaporizhzhia Raion
States and territories established in 1994
1994 establishments in Ukraine